Riyom is a Local Government Area in Plateau State, Nigeria.

The LGA has boundaries with Kaduna and Nasarawa State.

It is the gateway to the State when coming from the East and from Abuja.

The postal code of the area is 931.

Demographics
Languages spoken in Riyom LGA include: Berom, Iten and Takad.

References

Local Government Areas in Plateau State